Nagehan Akşan (born February 22, 1988) is a Turkish women's football defender , who plays in the Women's Super League for Çaykur Rizespor with jersey number 61. She was a member of the Turkish national team.

Club career 

Nagehan Akşan obtained her license for her hometown club Trabzonspor on November 16, 2007. After playing 32 matches and scoring two goals in two seasons, she transferred to Yalıspor in Istanbul. She capped 19 times and scored an own goal for Yalıspor in the 2010–11 season. For the 2011–12 season, she returned to Trabzon to join the Trabzon İdmanocağı, where she still plays.

At the end of the 2008–09 season, her team Trabzonspor became the league champion, and was entitled to play in the UEFA Women's Champions League as the first Turkish team debuting. Akşan took part at the 2009–10 UEFA Women's Champions League – Group D matches.

Akşan transferred to Kdz. Ereğlispor for the 2017–18 season.

On June 1, 2018, she signed with the Istanbul-based club Ataşehir Belediyespor before the 2017–18 league champion club's participation at the 2018–19 UEFA Women's Champions League qualifying round. She played in all three matches of the qualification round. In the 2018–19 league season, she was appointed captain of the team.

For the 2021-22 Turkcell Women's Super League season, she transferred to the newly founded team Çaykur Rizespor. In the 2022-23 Super League season, she returned to her former club  Ataşehir Beşediyespor.

International career 
In 2009, she was admitted to the Turkey women's national team to play in three matches of the 
UEFA Support International Tournament. At the 2011 FIFA Women's World Cup qualification – UEFA Group 5, she was member of the national team. However, she sat on the bench.

Career statistics 
.

Honours 
 Turkish Women's First League
 Trabzonspor
 Winners (1): 2008–09
 Runners-up (1): 2009–10

 Trabzon İdmanocağı
 Third places (3): 2011–12, 2014–15, 2015–16

References

External links 

Living people
1988 births
Sportspeople from Trabzon
Turkish women's footballers
Turkey women's international footballers
Women's association football defenders
Trabzonspor women's players
Trabzon İdmanocağı women's players
Karadeniz Ereğlispor players
Ataşehir Belediyespor players
Çaykur Rizespor (women's football) players